Polaris Inc. is an American automotive manufacturer headquartered in Medina, Minnesota, United States. Polaris was founded in Roseau, Minnesota, where it still has engineering and manufacturing facilities. The company manufactured motorcycles through its Victory Motorcycles subsidiary until January 2017, and currently produces motorcycles through the Indian Motorcycle subsidiary, which it purchased in April 2011.  Polaris produced personal watercraft from 1994–2004. The company was originally named Polaris Industries Inc. and was renamed in 2019 to Polaris Inc.

Robin (a subsidiary of Subaru Corporation) previously developed and supplied all-terrain vehicle (ATV) and snowmobile engines for Polaris Inc. Starting in 1995 with the Polaris Magnum 425 4-stroke ATV and in 1997, with the introduction of the "twin 700" snowmobile engine Polaris started the development and production in house of the "Liberty" line of engines, now found in many models across their current production lines. Since that time Polaris has continued to develop their in-house engine production capacity, now designing and manufacturing all of their own power plants, while maintaining the partnership with Subaru.

In 2010, Polaris relocated a portion of its utility and sport vehicle assembly to Mexico. Components are manufactured in Osceola, Wisconsin and the vehicle assembly is done in Roseau, Minnesota. The vast majority of powertrain and vehicles for the off-road line are manufactured in the Osceola and Roseau facilities, respectively. Both the Victory and Indian motorcycle brands are American made with complete powertrains and vehicle assembly located in Osceola, Wisconsin, and Spirit Lake, Iowa, respectively.

History

Edgar Hetteen (later described by the Snowmobile Hall of Fame in St. Germain, Wisconsin as the father of the snowmobile), David Johnson, and Edgar's brother Allan Hetteen were partners in Hetteen Hoist and Derrick in Roseau, Minnesota. Edgar had dropped out of school after the eighth grade in 1934. David Johnson and company employees Paul Knochenmus and Orlen Johnson, who was the first person to ride a Polaris, decided to create a vehicle that could travel through snow. These vehicles' primary use was to make hunting locations more accessible. David Johnson and several employees created the prototype in 1954 while Edgar was on a business trip. Edgar returned to Roseau to discover the snow machine and was furious the employees had used their time and company resources on the machine. This first machine used a grain silo conveyor belt as a track, a Briggs and Stratton motor, and an old Chevy bumper for skis. Edgar was skeptical of its value, and the No. 1 sled was soon sold to Roseau lumberyard owner "Silver Pete" H.F. Peterson for $465 in order to meet company payroll.

However, the employees continued to focus on building snowmobiles and soon a second model was created, with Allan Hetteen leading the way; it was called the Polaris Sno Traveler. The first production model rolled off the assembly line in Minnesota in 1956. As Polaris snowmobiles gained sales traction, Edgar Hetteen became an advocate of the new product line. In order to promote the new snowmobile and prove its reliability and usefulness, in 1960 Edgar led a three-snowmobile, 1,200-mile trek across the Alaskan wilderness, starting from Bethel, Alaska. The trip took three weeks, and much of the time, Edgar struggled to maintain 10 mph over the snow. The Fairbanks Daily News-Miner put them on its front page. However, Edgar's absence caused problems for him with the Roseau bank's board of directors. Soon after completing the trip, Edgar left the company in June and started a competing company called Polar Manufacturing in Thief River Falls, Minnesota. The company name later changed to Arctic Enterprises; in the mid-1980s it filed for bankruptcy amid fierce competition as snowmobiles became popular and other manufacturers jumped into the market. The company emerged from bankruptcy and continues on today as Arctic Cat.

Polaris began developing a smaller consumer-sized, front-engine snowmobile to compete with the Ski-Doo in the early 1960s. In 1964, Polaris released the Comet. However, the Comet soon ran into problems as it could not travel in all types of snow conditions. Polaris then recalled the sleds and quickly developed a new prototype to avoid bankruptcy. The new model, the 1965 Mustang, became a hit as a family snowmobile and boosted Polaris sales. Polaris continued to develop snowmobiles similar to this model throughout the 1960s-1970s, and went on to become one of the leaders in the snowmobile industry.

In the early 1980s, Polaris started creating an Indy style snowmobile with IFS and a wider stance. They continued with the Indy style sled in the 90s with the Storm, XLT, XCR, Ultra, RMK, and Trail lines, within the last few years Polaris has re-introduced the INDY model name. In 1985, Polaris introduced the Scrambler ATC and Trail Boss, which are considered to be the first American-made production all-terrain vehicles (ATV). In the early 1990s, Polaris introduced the Polaris Rocky Mountain King (RMK)- a snowmobile specific for mountain terrain. In May 2009, Polaris announced the creation of an On-Road Vehicle Division. The new division will be devoted to the growth of Victory motorcycles and other on-road products and brands. In 2010, Polaris introduced the Polaris Rush snowmobile which had a new suspension system and better trail handling capabilities. This snowmobile is also available with retro graphics on the Rush and Iq models. In late 2005, Polaris announced that it would purchase a portion of KTM Motorcycles. Through this venture KTM has developed their own ATV and Polaris has developed Sport ATVs which utilize the KTM 525 and 450 powerplants.

On May 21, 2010, Polaris announced that it was opening a new manufacturing plant in Mexico. The sister facility in Osceola, Wisconsin still remains in full operation. The opening of the Monterrey, Mexico facility is anticipated to save the company $30 million annually, with most of that savings coming from lower wages.  The Monterrey facility has 3 assembly lines devoted to production of Ranger side-by-sides for global markets. The original intent of the Monterrey facility was to serve markets in the Southern US plus Mexico and North America.

In October 2011, Polaris announced an investment in Brammo, Inc., an electric vehicle company based in Ashland, Oregon, United States. Its first production electric motorcycle, the Brammo Enertia, is assembled in Ashland and sold at dealerships. Polaris continued its investment in Brammo when it participated in the $13 million opening tranche of Brammo's Series C funding round in July 2012. Polaris had been showing interest in electric propulsion, producing an electric version of its Ranger Side-by-Side and more recently buying Global Electric Motorcars (GEM). As one publication put it, "This latest move likely signals the addition of clean and quiet drivetrains to ATVs and motorcycles under the global giant's brand umbrella – snowmobiles may have to wait on battery breakthroughs before they become commercially feasible." On January 15, 2015, Polaris announced that it had purchased the entire electric motorcycle business from Brammo. Production of electric motorcycles was slated to commence at Polaris' factory in Spirit Lake, Iowa during the second half of 2015.  Polaris also manufactures Victory and Indian motorcycles at the Spirit Lake factory.

In 2012, production restarted on the Indy-named sleds (stopped in 2004 with the Indy 500) with the release of the 2013 Indy 600 and Indy 600 SP. For 2014, Polaris will expand the Indy name and provide model variants for nearly all categories (the one exception being the "Mountain" class).

On April 11, 2013, Polaris announced that it acquired Aixam-Mega, a French quadricycle manufacturer.

On January 9, 2015, Polaris announced it will be opening a new 600,000-square-foot facility in Huntsville, Alabama that will employ at least 1,700 workers. Construction on the new manufacturing plant is set to start in early 2015 and should be opened by the spring of 2016. The plant will support several core processes including, vehicle assembly, chassis and body painting, welding, fabrication and injection molding.

On March 7, 2016, Polaris acquired Taylor-Dunn, a manufacturer of industrial vehicles based in Anaheim, CA.

On January 9, 2017, Polaris Chairman and CEO Michael Scott announced they would be shutting down Victory Motorcycles.  They announced they will continue to honor warranties and produce parts for Victory Motorcycles for the next 10 years.

In April 2018, Polaris Industries agreed to pay a record $27.25 million civil penalty for failing to report defective off-road vehicles.

In May 2018, Polaris reentered the production of boats by purchasing the Indiana-based Boat Holdings LLC for $805 million. The company invested further in its boating division in January 2019 with the acquisition of Marquis-Larson Boat Group out of Pulaski, Wisconsin. Production of Marquis-Larson moved to a facility in Syracuse, Indiana. They then went on to make the Polaris Slingshot, a three-wheeler.

On July 29, 2019, the company changed its name from Polaris Industries Inc. to Polaris Inc. and commenced trading with the new name on August 8, 2019.

Racing
Polaris Racing is one of the big four factory racing teams on the World Power Sports Association (WPSA) Snocross circuit. With 44 signed riders, they also run in Hill Cross, Oval Track Racing, and Cross Country Racing. The Polaris Racing Team won 8 different Championships in the 2006–2007 season. Arnar Gunnarsson (#26) won the Pro Open, Gústi (#10) won Pro Stock, Klara Björk (#89) won pro women at Iceland, T. J. Gulla (#44) won the WPSA Pro Stock Championship, Ross Martin (#837) won the WPSA Pro Open Championship, and Kylie Abramson (#87) won the WPSA Pro Women's Championship. Gabe Bunke (#74) has won the USCC Pro 600 Class Championship and USCC Pro Open Class. Dustin Wahl (#74) won the Pro Ice 440 Championship, the Pro Ice Formula Championship, and the Millennium 600 Open championship, and John Cyr III (#99) won the 2004 USCC Pro 700 Class Championship. Most all of the Polaris Racing riders drive the IQR 440, 600 or 700 Racer, depending on the class and the event. Polaris holds the most wins in the World's Longest, Toughest Snowmobile Race, the Iron Dog, a 2,000 mile race across Alaska.

Polaris Government and Defense

Polaris Government and Defense (formerly Polaris Defense) is a division of Polaris Industries founded in 2005 and re-branded in 2017. The division was created after years of successful implementation of the company's off-road vehicles in military theater. The division produces a range of vehicles to serve the United States and allied forces. Products include the MRZR platform, MVRS, MV700, RZR-SW and the DAGOR.

MRZR
In November 2016, the U.S. Marine Corps signed a $6.5 million contract with Polaris to deliver 145 MRZR-D ATVs.  Called the Utility Task Vehicle (UTV), it is a version of the vehicle already in use by U.S. Special Operations Command, but is designed to be diesel-powered and can run on JP-8 fuel.  The Marines bought the unarmored ATVs because they can fit inside an MV-22 Osprey, enabling them to be deployed from long distances, to provide logistics support to ground combat units, assisting them to travel and transport supplies quicker and easier than previously on foot.  The vehicles can carry four troops and have a small cargo bed capable of carrying  of payload.  It is planned to field 18 MRZR-Ds per infantry regiment.  The vehicles are to be delivered from late-January to April 2017.

DAGOR

DAGOR (Deployable Advanced Ground Off-road) is a purpose-built, ultra-light combat vehicle designed and built by Polaris Defense to meet the light-mobility needs of light infantry and special operations forces incorporating military commercial off-the-shelf (COTS) components and driveline system.

The DAGOR was developed under contract from elements of the United States Special Operations Command (SOCOM), Canadian Special Operations Forces Command (CANSOFCOM) and international Special Operations Forces (SOF) customers. The design using (COTS) components enables procurement of spares worldwide. The vehicle is produced by Michigan-based Roush Industries with deliveries commencing in November 2014 with fifteen vehicles for use by the United States Special Operations Command, in January 2015 with five vehicles for the Australian Special Air Service Regiment (SASR) to trial and deliveries were scheduled for the United Arab Emirates (UAE) in April 2015.
 In December, 2016, the Canadian Special Operations Forces Command announced that a contract valued at approximately was awarded for the acquisition of 52 ULCV with the option to procure an additional 26 vehicles over a two-year period. In July, 2017, Canadian Special Operations Forces Command exercised the option to procure an additional 10 ULCV, bringing the total number of ULCV under this acquisition to 62.

The vehicle can be configured in up to 48 different weapon configurations using the weapons ring and multiple pintle mounts. The vehicle is powered by a light weight, commercial off-the-shelf turbo diesel / JP8 engine located at the front section. The vehicle can transport a maximum payload of more than 1,400 kg or up to nine infantrymen in support of expeditionary missions. It offers high mobility and higher speeds over rough terrains. The vehicle is certified for air drop and internal air transport by CH-47 Chinook heavy-lift helicopter, and sling load under UH-60 Black Hawk utility helicopters. The vehicle supports low velocity air drop (LVAD) method.

On March 21, 2018, Polaris unveiled the DAGOR A1, which can carry approximately 20% more payload compared to the original DAGOR.

See also
 Eicher Polaris Multix, a personal utility vehicle manufactured by Eicher Motors and Polaris India.
 Polaris Slingshot,  a three-wheeled motor vehicle
 Boeing Phantom Badger, a combat vehicle platform similar to the DAGOR.

References

External links

 

Polaris Inc.
Manufacturing companies established in 1954
1954 establishments in Minnesota
Manufacturing companies based in Minnesota